Karl Fairbank (born 1 June 1963) is a former professional rugby league footballer who played in the 1980s and 1990s, and coached in the 1990s, 2000s and 2010s.

Playing career

Bradford Northern/Bradford Bulls
Fairbank signed for Bradford Northern from amateur club Elland in July 1986. He spent his entire professional career at the club, scoring 110 tries in over 300 appearances.

Fairbank played , and scored a try in Bradford Northern's 12–12 draw with Castleford in the 1987 Yorkshire Cup Final during the 1987–88 season at Headingley, Leeds on 17 October 1987, and played in the 11–2 victory in the  replay at Elland Road, Leeds on 31 October 1987. He also played in the 20–14 victory over Featherstone Rovers in the 1989 Yorkshire Cup Final during the 1989–90 season at Headingley, Leeds on 5 November 1989.

Fairbank played , in Bradford Northern's 15–8 defeat by Wigan in the 1992–93 Regal Trophy Final during the 1992–93 season at Elland Road, Leeds on Saturday 23 January 1993.

Fairbank was an substitute in Bradford Bulls's 32–40 defeat by St. Helens in the 1996 Challenge Cup Final at Wembley Stadium, London on 26 April 1996.

Fairbank announced his retirement at the end of the inaugural Super League season in 1996, with the club retiring his squad number, the number 21 shirt, in his honour. Bradford have since re-used the squad number.

Fairbank was included in Bradford's, 'Millennium Masters', 'Bull Masters', and in August 2007 he was named in the 'Team Of The Century', one of only six players have been included in all three lists.

International honours
Fairbank won caps for Great Britain while at Bradford Northern in the 1985 - 1988 Rugby League World Cup in 1987 against Papua New Guinea (sub), in 1990 against France, Papua New Guinea, and Australia (sub), in 1991 against France, in the 1989–1992 Rugby League World Cup in 1991 against Papua New Guinea (sub), in 1992 against France, in the 1989–1992 Rugby League World Cup in 1992 against France, in 1992 against Papua New Guinea, and New Zealand (sub), in 1993 against France (sub), and New Zealand (3 matches), and in 1994 against France. He was selected to go on the 1992 Great Britain Lions tour of Australia and New Zealand.

Personal life
Karl Fairbank is son of the rugby league footballer for Huddersfield and Leeds; Jack Fairbank, and brother of the rugby league footballer for Leeds, Oldham and Swinton; John Fairbank, the rugby league footballer for Halifax; Dick Fairbank, and the rugby league footballer for Oldham  and Keighley; Mark Fairbank, and the uncle to Mark's son, the rugby league forward; Jacob Fairbank.

References

External links
(archived by web.archive.org) Crooks in trouble
(archived by web.archive.org) When Britain defeated the Aussies
Photograph '1987/88 Team Photo - 1987/88 Team Photo - 27/08/1987' at rlhp.co.uk
Photograph '1989/90 Team Photo - 1989/90 Team Photo - 26/08/1989' at rlhp.co.uk
Photograph 'Return to Odsal - Ex-players lead out the team on the return to Odsal after two seasons at Valley Parade - 09/03/2003' at rlhp.co.uk
Photograph 'Trevor kisses the turf - Trevor Foster kisses the turf on the return to Odsal after two seasons at Valley Parade - 09/03/2003' at rlhp.co.uk

1963 births
Living people
Bradford Bulls players
English rugby league players
Great Britain national rugby league team players
Place of birth missing (living people)
Rugby league props
Rugby league second-rows